The 2012 Portuguese motorcycle Grand Prix was the third round of the 2012 Grand Prix motorcycle racing season. It took place on the weekend of 4–6 May 2012 at the Autódromo do Estoril located in Estoril, Portugal.

Classification

MotoGP

Moto2

Moto3

Championship standings after the race (MotoGP)
Below are the standings for the top five riders and constructors after round three has concluded.

Riders' Championship standings

Constructors' Championship standings

 Note: Only the top five positions are included for both sets of standings.

References

Portuguese motorcycle Grand Prix
Portuguese
Motorcycle Grand Prix
Portuguese motorcycle Grand Prix